Vultures of the Sea is a 1928 American adventure film serial directed by Richard Thorpe. The film is considered to be lost.

Cast
 Johnnie Walker
 Shirley Mason
 Tom Santschi
 Frank Hagney
 Boris Karloff - Grouchy
 Horace B. Carpenter (unconfirmed)
 George Magrill
 Joseph Bennett
 Arthur Dewey
 Joe Mack (as Joseph Mack)
 J. P. Lockney (as John P. Lockney)
 Lafe McKee
 Leo D. Maloney
 Tom Mintz
 Jack Perrin

References

External links

1928 films
1928 adventure films
1928 lost films
American silent serial films
American black-and-white films
American adventure films
Films directed by Richard Thorpe
Films produced by Nat Levine
Lost American films
Mascot Pictures film serials
Lost adventure films
1920s American films
Silent adventure films